3-Methyl-3-penten-2-one is an unsaturated aliphatic ketone. It is an isomer of mesityl oxide and isomesityl oxide. It is a precursor of 3-methyl-2-pentanone (methyl sec-butyl ketone) and is obtained by acid-catalyzed dehydration of 4-hydroxy-3-methyl-2-pentanone. It is used as an intermediate in organic chemistry syntheses.

References 

Enones